The Adventure of Sherlock Holmes' Smarter Brother is a 1975 American musical comedy film with Gene Wilder, Marty Feldman, Madeline Kahn, Dom DeLuise, Roy Kinnear, and Leo McKern. The film was Wilder's directorial debut, from  his own original script.

Douglas Wilmer and Thorley Walters appear as Sherlock Holmes and Dr. Watson, respectively. Wilmer had previously appeared as Sherlock Holmes in the 1960s BBC TV series, and Walters played Watson in three other films: Sherlock Holmes and the Deadly Necklace (1962), The Best House in London (1969), and Silver Blaze (1977).

Plot
In 1891, Foreign Secretary Lord Redcliff haphazardly receives a document from Queen Victoria; the document is stolen from his safe later that night. Sherlock Holmes and Dr. Watson discuss the case. Deciding to lie low for a while, Holmes informs Watson that he will delegate cases to his younger brother, Sigerson, who has toiled in his brother's shadow without credit for decades. At a railway station, Holmes passes the message to Scotland Yard records clerk Orville Sacker.

Arriving at Sigerson's flat, Sacker finds him practicing his fencing and swordplay. Sigerson expresses bitterness and resentment over being unable to replicate Sherlock's success, mocking his big brother as "Sheer Luck" Holmes. Arriving next is a woman claiming to be Bessie Bellwood, but who is really Jenny Hill, a music hall singer who believes she is being blackmailed by opera singer Eduardo Gambetti over a lewd letter she sent him.

Sigerson attends one of Hill's performances and twice saves her from attempts on her life. The next day, he seduces her in her dressing room. She reveals that she stole the document from Redcliff's safe and claims that Redcliff is her father. When Sigerson meets with Redcliff, he learns that Hill is in fact Redcliff's fiancée.

The trail leads to Gambetti, who has made a deal with criminal mastermind Professor Moriarty to sell him the document, which foreign powers have offered £50,000 to acquire. Moriarty pays, but the distrustful Gambetti proposes that he hand over the document during the debut of his opera so that he has time to deposit the money. Sigerson and Sacker infiltrate the opera, which soon devolves into chaos. Sigerson and Moriarty confront each other backstage and are drawn into a sword fight that corners Sigerson on an outside ledge. Under threat of death, Sigerson agrees to hand over what Moriarty thinks is the document before the chimes of Big Ben cause Moriarty to lose balance and plunge into the water below. Moriarty opens the document to reveal a game of tic-tac-toe: Sigerson had positioned the real document for Sherlock to recover.

The final scene is of Sigerson Holmes running through a park to attend Jenny and Redcliff's wedding. Sitting on a bench in the park, Jenny tells Sigerson that she has called off the wedding, as Sherlock and Watson watch in disguise. Sigerson and Jenny joyfully reconcile and dance.

Cast

Production
Gene Wilder was having lunch with Richard Roth when it was suggested that Wilder spoof Sherlock Holmes, but Wilder expressed doubts about making fun of such an iconic character. Roth approached Wilder again a week later and inquired if Wilder had given any more thought to the idea of a Sherlock Holmes film. Wilder replied "No, but I have given a great deal of thought to Sherlock's insanely jealous brother Sigi." Wilder began writing the screenplay as production was wrapping on Young Frankenstein, writing in parts for his co-stars Madeline Kahn and Marty Feldman. Wilder's screenplay reveals a deep knowledge of Conan Doyle's characters as Marty Feldman's character, Sgt. Orville Stanley Sacker, shares a similar name with that originally applied to John Watson, Ormond Sacker. On the set of Young Frankenstein, Mel Brooks warned Wilder that now that he was writing movies, he would eventually move to directing movies to protect his scripts. After Smarter Brother, Wilder went on to write, direct, and star in three more features over the next ten years (The World's Greatest Lover in 1977, The Woman in Red in 1984 and Haunted Honeymoon in 1986).

Reception

Box office
The film earned $9.4 million in rentals in North America during its theatrical release.

Critical response
Vincent Canby of The New York Times called the film "a charming slapstick comedy" that like Young Frankenstein "is full of affection and generous feelings for the genre it's having fun with." Arthur D. Murphy of Variety wrote, "Gene Wilder now joins Brooks in that elusive pantheon of madcap humor, by virtue of Wilder's script, title characterization and directorial debut, all of which are outstanding." Gene Siskel of the Chicago Tribune gave the film two stars out of four, calling it "tedious" and Sigerson "a bland character at the center of a gimmick-filled movie" that "recalls the great detective only by name and occasional costume. There's really no story here, and certainly no mystery." Charles Champlin of the Los Angeles Times declared it "a light, easy, brisk but unforced, professional, kindly and ingratiating trip through Holmes' sweet home as it never was".

Gary Arnold of The Washington Post called it "an enjoyable, encouraging beginning" to Wilder's career as a writer-director that "reveals a surprisingly inventive and conscientious comic imagination at work". Pauline Kael of The New Yorker wrote that Wilder "wrote the roles for the actors but didn't write characters for them to play. He provided lots of lovely, sideswiping bits of business but no conceptions that would allow the actors to surprise us with something new or that would enable us to get involved in what's happening to them." John Pym of The Monthly Film Bulletin called it "better in its parts than as a whole, and essentially a showcase for the individual performances of Wilder himself, Marty Feldman, Madeline Kahn and, particularly, the perpetually energised, rubber-faced Dom DeLuise."

Home media
The film was released on DVD on April 4, 2006.

See also
 List of American films of 1975

References

External links
 
 
 

1975 films
1975 comedy films
1975 directorial debut films
1970s comedy mystery films
1970s English-language films
1970s musical comedy films
1970s parody films
20th Century Fox films
American comedy mystery films
American comedy thriller films
American musical comedy films
American parody films
Films directed by Gene Wilder
Films scored by John Morris
Films set in 1891
Films with screenplays by Gene Wilder
Sherlock Holmes films
Sherlock Holmes pastiches
1970s American films